Uroš Stojanov (born 5 January 1989) is a Serbian footballer who plays as a forward for Faroe Islands Premier League club Skála.

Career
In June 2015, Stojanov was rumoured to Zorya Luhansk.

On 25 June 2021, Stojanov signed with B36 Tórshavn, after he became joint top goalscorer of the Faroe Islands Premier League the season before for league rivals ÍF Fuglafjørður. 

Stojanov joined newly promoted Skála on 19 June 2022.

References

External links
 
 

1989 births
Living people
Sportspeople from Kikinda
Association football forwards
Serbian footballers
FK Donji Srem players
FK Radnički Pirot players
NK Jedinstvo Bihać players
NK Zvijezda Gradačac players
Ayia Napa FC players
Uros Stojanov
PGS Kissamikos players
FK Rudar Pljevlja players
Uros Stojanov
ÍF Fuglafjørður players
B36 Tórshavn players
Skála ÍF players
Cypriot First Division players
Uros Stojanov
Super League Greece 2 players
Faroe Islands Premier League players
Serbian expatriate footballers
Serbian expatriate sportspeople in Cyprus
Serbian expatriate sportspeople in Thailand
Serbian expatriate sportspeople in Greece
Serbian expatriate sportspeople in the Faroe Islands
Expatriate footballers in Cyprus
Expatriate footballers in Thailand
Expatriate footballers in the Faroe Islands
Expatriate footballers in Greece